The Winter Haven Public Library, Kathryn L. Smith Memorial is located in Winter Haven, Florida at 325 Avenue A NW.  It is a member of the Polk County Library Cooperative.

History 
Winter Haven first established a library in 1907, when Dr. Samuel Harrison Woods placed a few books on a shelf in his drugstore. Mrs. Woods was in charge of the lending and returns. In 1915, the Women's Civic League (later the Woman's Club of Winter Haven) announced that it would be assuming responsibility and control of the library, now situated on the second floor of a commercial building downtown, and did so until 1952.

In 1924, the library moved to the former home of a prominent citizen (still located downtown), and, in 1952, the Woman's Club of Winter Haven donated the building, collection, plans and monies for a new library to the City of Winter Haven. In 1955, the first portion of the library located on Central Avenue was opened, with 6,000 books and plenty of room to expand the collection. Thirty years later, the library held a collection of 48,000, and had added an annex ten years earlier, in 1976. Also, in 1976, the Friends of the Winter Haven Public Library Inc. was formed with its stated purpose "to promote public interest and participation in the Winter Haven Public Library, its services, facilities, and needs, and to promote gifts of books, magazines, desirable collections, endowments, bequests, and any other thing which would be helpful to those using the facilities of the public library" The organization has a small bookshop across the hall from the library that is staffed by volunteers. In the current building they sell weeded books for $1 or less, and at predetermined times in the year, gives books away to the public. The third Saturday of each month is "Half-Price Day."  Everything in the store, including the collectibles, is sold for half of the marked price.

In 1997, the Polk County Library Cooperative was created. This library co-op allows patrons from any location in the county to receive and enjoy materials from any Polk County Library; a mobile library is included along with Books by Mail (a service that allows a member to check out material online upon which point it is mailed to them with no fees.

Current library
In 2004, the current library opened, and was titled the 'Kathryn L. Smith Memorial Library'. Mrs. Smith had been Head Librarian from 1973 to 2004, and was responsible for many programs, including Friends of the Library, and had helped raise funds for the current building. In 2014, a new space was created in the Information Commons, called the S.E.E.D. (Science, Education, Exploration, Design) Lab. This space offers more flexible hands-on access to research and project space, including a 3-D printer and a Cameo electronic cutter that allows users to create designs for fabrics, vinyl, etching glass, and scrapbooking.

References

Public libraries in Florida
Libraries established in 1907
1907 establishments in Florida